Mikhak may refer to:
 Mikhak, Pain Jam
 Mikhak, Salehabad